Jewish copper plates of Cochin (Malayalam: ജൂതശാസനം), also known as Cochin plates of Bhaskara Ravi-varman, is a royal charter issued by the Chera Perumal king of Kerala, south India to Joseph Rabban, a Jewish merchant magnate of Kodungallur. The charter shows the status and importance of the Jewish colony in Kodungallur (Cranganore) near Cochin on the Malabar Coast. 

The charter is engraved in Vattezhuthu script with additional Grantha characters in the vernacular of medieval Kerala on three sides of two copper plates (28 lines). It records a grant by king Bhaskara Ravi Varma (Malayalam: Parkaran Iravivanman) to Joseph/Yusuf Rabban (Malayalam: Issuppu Irappan) of the rights of merchant guild anjuman (Malayalam: anjuvannam) along with several other rights and privileges. Rabban is exempted from all payments made by other settlers in the city of Muyirikkode (at the same time extending to him all the rights of the other settlers). These rights and privileges are given perpetuity to all his descendants. The document is attested by a number of chieftains from southern and northern Kerala. 

Anjuvannam, the old Malayalam form of hanjamana/anjuman was a south Indian merchant guild organised by Jewish, Christian, and Islamic merchants from West Asian countries. The document is dated by historians to c. 1000 CE. It is also evident from the tone of the copper plates that the Jews were not newcomers to the Malabar Coast at the time of its decree. 

The plates are carefully preserved in an iron box, known as the Pandeal, within the Paradesi Synagogue at Mattancherry (Cochin).

Text 
The plate is engraved in vernacular of medieval Kerala using the Vattezhuthu (script) with Grantha characters . The charter ends with a list of witnesses to the deed which includes several chieftains of southern and northern Kerala, the Commander of the Eastern Forces, and the Officer who Takes Down Oral Communications. 

{{cquote|"Svasti Sri!'"This is the gift [prasada] that His Majesty [Tiruvati], King of Kings [Ko Konmai Kontan Ko], Sri Parkaran Iravivanmar, who is to wield sceptre for several thousand years, was pleased to make during the thirty sixth year opposite to the second year of his reign, on the day when he was pleased to reside at Muyirikkottu. 

"We have granted to Issuppu Irappan, the [guild of] ancuvannam, tolls by the boat and by other carts, ancuvannam dues, the right to employ the day lamp, decorative cloth, palanquin, umbrella, kettledrum, trumpet, gateway, arch, arched roof, weapon and rest of the seventy two privileges. We have remitted duty and weighing fee.

"Moreover, according to this copper-plate grant given to him, he shall be exempted from payments made by other settlers in the town to the king [koyil], but he shall enjoy what they enjoy.

"To Issuppu Irappan, proprietor of the ancuvannam, his male and female issues, nephews, and sons-in-law, ancuvannam shall belong by hereditary succession as long as the sun and moon endure—

"Prosperity!

"This is attested by Kovarttana Mattandan, the utaiyavar of Venatu.

"This is attested by Kotai Cirikantan, the utaiyavar of Venpalinatu.

"This is attested by Manavepala Manaviyan, the utaiyavar of Eralanatu.

"This is attested by Irayaran Cattan, the utaiyavar of Valluvanatu.

"This is attested by Kotai Iravi, the utaiyavar of Netumpuraiyurnatu.

"This is attested by Murkkan Cattan, the Commander of the Eastern Forces.

"This writing is executed by Vanralaceri Kantan-Kunrappolan, the Officer who Takes Down Oral Communication."
| sign = 
| source = Translated by M. G. S. Narayanan
}}

Dating and analysis
It is evident from the language of Jewish copper plates that the Jews were not newcomers to the Malabar Coast at the time of its decree. The language of the plates "certainly prove that they [the Jews] were present in the midst of the local people [of Kerala] for at least several generations if not centuries". 

 Dating 
The plates have been variously dated by different historians to the 4th, 5th, 6th, 8th and 11th-century.
 The traditional date for these copper plates according to the Cochin Jews is 379 CE. 
 Another date was documented in a letter dated 1676 CE from the leaders of Cochin Jews to Portuguese-Sephardic community of Amsterdam, using their own extant calendar, states Walter Fischel – a scholar of Oriental history of Jewish people. The letter said, among other things, "... now all this was written and sealed with the King's seal, and cut on a bronze tablet with an iron pen and diamond point, so that his successors may never accuse us of lying or change the agreement. This was done in the year 4520 after the creation of the world, and that bronze tablet is still present to our eyes." This date, states Fischel, would correspond to 490 CE in the Gregorian calendar.
 In his thesis of 1972, later published in 1996 and reprinted several times in India as Perumals of Kerala'', Narayanan dates them to c. 1000 CE, basing his analysis on the 38th (2 + 36) "A-series" regnal year of king Bhaskara Ravi Manukuladitya who ruled between 962 and 1021 AD. 
 Nathan Katz states that the Kochi Jews trace their history to many centuries earlier for good reasons, yet these plates are more likely from the 10th or 11th-century.
 Historians Y. Subbarayalu, Ranabir Chakravarti, Noboru Karashima, Kesavan Veluthat,  Pius Malekandathil, Elizabeth Lambourn, Ophira Gamliel and Manu Devadevan agrees with Narayanan's 1971-72 dating (c. 1000/01 AD).

Context 
The decree of the plates by the Chera ruler of Kerala needs to be taken in the context of the expanding Chola Empire (and the constant threat of invasion from them). The Cochin Jewish community likely were already supporting the Chera state and once the Chola attacks on Kerala began in c. 998–999 CE, these plates and rights granted therein are "quite possibly" the reward for the financial or military assistance and support from the Jewish leader to the Chera king.

Legacy 
The grant is or was cherished by both "Black Jews" and the "White Jews" (the Spanish Jews) of Cochin as a historical document and their "original" settlement deed.

 During the visit of Prime Minister Ariel Sharon to India in 2003, the then provincial minister presented him with a replica of the Jewish copper plates. 
 Similar replicas were also gifted by Narendra Modi, the Prime Minister of India, to Prime Minister Benjamin Netanyahu during a state visit to Israel in 2017.

See also
 Quilon Syrian copper plates
 Thomas of Cana copper plates

References

Further reading
 
 

10th-century inscriptions
11th-century inscriptions
Vatteluttu
History of Kerala
Judaic inscriptions
Malayalam inscriptions
Copper objects
Archaeological corpora
Chera dynasty
Kerala history inscriptions
Cochin Jews
Judaism in Kerala